The following is a chronological list of Eurodance songs.

Late 1980s

1990s

1990–1994

1995–1999

2000s

2010s

See also
List of Eurodance artists

References

Eurodance